Lysinibacillus cavernae is a Gram-positive, rod-shaped and motile bacterium from the genus of Lysinibacillus which has been isolated from soil from a karst cave in Libo County.

References

Bacillaceae
Bacteria described in 2021